Dinorwig, sometimes spelled Dinorwic, is a village located high above Llyn Padarn, near Llanberis, in Wales.

Etymology
It is thought that the village was part of the territory of the pre-Roman Ordovices tribe. From mediaeval times it has been part of the township, now the community, of Llanddeiniolen. The element -orwig, -orweg has been thought to derive from the tribal name Ordovices; this idea was rejected by linguist Melville Richards for lack of a sufficiently early record of a form *Orddwig..

Facilities
Dinorwig is one of the main access points for Dinorwic quarry. It has a bus service to and from Caernarfon, with connecting services to and from Bangor at Deiniolen.

History

 The village has a long history of slate quarrying. The Romans used local slate for the construction of Segontium, and slates from the valley were used in the construction of Caernarfon Castle. The main local quarry was the Dinorwic Quarry, which was worked from the late 1770s until 1969. After the First World War, cheaper alternative roofing materials became available and production at the quarry declined. This led to a decline in the fortune of the village itself and many moved away to nearby towns such as Bangor and Caernarfon.

Today, the village shares its name with a pumped storage hydroelectric power station, Dinorwig power station. The village is also the location of the Blue Peris Mountain Centre, a residential outdoor activities centre operated by Bedford Borough Council and Central Bedfordshire Council.

Part of the film Willow was shot in the disused Dinorwig Quarry, in June 1987.

References

External links

Photos of Dinorwic and surrounding area, geograph.co.uk
Blue Peris Mountain Centre, Dinorwig

Villages in Gwynedd
Slate industry in Wales
Llanddeiniolen
Mining communities in Wales